Magadanichthys is a monospecific genus of marine ray-finned fish,. Its only species is Magadanichthys skopetsi which is found in the northwestern Pacific Ocean off the Russian Far East.

References

Gymnelinae
Monotypic ray-finned fish genera